Aeroflot Flight 109 ( Reys 109 Aeroflota) was a scheduled domestic passenger flight from Moscow to Chita with stopovers in Chelyabinsk, Novosibirsk, and Irkutsk.  On the final leg of the route on 18 May 1973 a terrorist hijacked the aircraft, demanding to be flown to China; the terrorist's bomb detonated in flight after he was shot by the air marshal.

Aircraft 
The aircraft involved in the accident was a Tupolev Tu-104A registered СССР-42379 to Aeroflot. The cabin layout originally had enough seats for 70 passengers, but the seating configuration was changed to accommodate 85 passengers.  The Tupolev Tu-104 took its first flight on 17 May 1958.  At the time of the accident, the aircraft sustained 19,329 flight hours and 8,841 pressurization cycles.

Crew 
72 passengers were aboard the flight, including four children.  Nine crew members were aboard the flight.  The cockpit crew consisted of:
 Captain Nikolai Obodyansky
 Co-pilot Yuri Ponomarev
 Navigator Vladislav Baryshnikov 
 Flight engineer Georgy Kuzenkov
 Radio operator Nikolai Yefimtsev

Synopsis 
The flight carried out the Moscow-Irkutsk part of the route without incident. Shortly thereafter at 03:36 the flight radio transmitted an indication of danger three times; the crew then informed air traffic control that a passenger in the cabin insisted the flight change course. The controller confirmed receipt of the information.

At 03:38 a coded transmission indicating the flight was in danger was sent, but was interrupted after the ninth dash.  When the onboard security officer Vladimir Yezhikov shot the hijacker, the bomb detonated.  The dispatcher informed the flight of their location relative to the airport, but the flight did not respond; the spot on the radar screen where the flight was appeared like a blur before it disappeared from the radar completely.

None of the 81 people aboard the aircraft survived.

Conclusions 
Five eyewitnesses reported seeing and hearing an explosion in the air at between 09:35 and 09:45 local time (03:35 to 03:45 Moscow time); according to the commission responsible for the investigation, the aircraft broke up mid-air into several sections consistent with a sharp sudden change in pressure.

Forensic investigation revealed that the explosion was caused by passenger Chingis Yunusogly Rzayev, born in Irkutsk in 1941. When he tried to infiltrate the cockpit the policeman Vladimir Yezhikov shot him in the back; the bullet hit the area of the 8th intercostal space before it penetrated the heart.

See also 

 United Airlines Flight 93
 Air Vietnam Flight 706
 Pacific Air Lines Flight 773
 Pan Am Flight 103

References

External links
 Aviation Safety network

Aviation accidents and incidents in 1973
Aviation accidents and incidents in the Soviet Union
May 1973 events in Asia
Accidents and incidents involving the Tupolev Tu-104
1973 in the Soviet Union
1973 murders in Asia
Airliner bombings
Airliner accidents and incidents caused by hijacking
109
Mass murder in 1973
Terrorist incidents in the Soviet Union
Terrorist incidents in the Soviet Union in the 1970s
Terrorist incidents in Europe in 1973
Terrorist incidents in Asia in 1973
Explosions in 1973